Norwood Court is a village in St. Louis County, Missouri, United States. The population was 959 at the 2010 census.

Geography

Demographics

2010 census
At the 2010 census there were 959 people, 530 households, and 210 families living in the village. The racial makeup of the village was 4.1% White, 94.2% African American, 0.1% Native American, 0.1% Asian, 0.3% from other races, and 1.3% from two or more races. Hispanic or Latino of any race were 0.4%.

Of the 530 households 24.5% had children under the age of 18 living with them, 11.9% were married couples living together, 22.5% had a female householder with no husband present, 5.3% had a male householder with no wife present, and 60.4% were non-families. 51.3% of households were one person and 8.1% were one person aged 65 or older. The average household size was 1.81 and the average family size was 2.64.

The median age in the village was 31.5 years. 19.5% of residents were under the age of 18; 18.1% were between the ages of 18 and 24; 29.6% were from 25 to 44; 24.4% were from 45 to 64; and 8.4% were 65 or older. The gender makeup of the village was 39.8% male and 60.2% female.

2000 census
At the 2000 census there were 1,061 people, 583 households, and 240 families living in the town. The racial makeup of the town was 5.47% White, 92.74% African American, 0.28% Native American, 0.38% Asian, 0.28% from other races, and 0.85% from two or more races. Hispanic or Latino of any race were 0.47%.

Of the 583 households 23.8% had children under the age of 18 living with them, 16.1% were married couples living together, 19.4% had a female householder with no husband present, and 58.8% were non-families. 51.3% of households were one person and 7.2% were one person aged 65 or older. The average household size was 1.82 and the average family size was 2.68.

The age distribution was 21.7% under the age of 18, 10.9% from 18 to 24, 41.2% from 25 to 44, 18.2% from 45 to 64, and 8.0% 65 or older. The median age was 31 years. For every 100 females, there were 85.2 males. For every 100 females age 18 and over, there were 83.4 males.

The median household income was $28,375 and the median family income  was $28,594. Males had a median income of $29,453 versus $22,955 for females. The per capita income for the town was $19,684. About 13.0% of families and 13.9% of the population were below the poverty line, including 20.9% of those under age 18 and 5.6% of those age 65 or over.

References

Villages in St. Louis County, Missouri
Villages in Missouri